Sahil Kukreja (born 9 July 1985) is an Indian first-class cricketer who plays for Mumbai. He made his first-class debut for Mumbai in the 2005–06 Ranji Trophy on 1 December 2005. He announced his retirement from all forms of cricket in 2011 at the age of 26.

References

External links
 

1985 births
Living people
Indian people
Indian cricketers
Mumbai cricketers
Sindhi people
Indian people of Sindhi descent